Ana Cartianu (19 April 1908 – 24 April 2001) was a Romanian academic, essayist and translator.

Biography
She was born in Urșani village, in Horezu commune, Vâlcea County. She studied at Bedford College, London (1928–32), and received her degree from the Literature Department, School of English Studies of Cernăuți University in 1934.

In 1936, she co-founded the School of English Language and Literature at the University of Bucharest, where she would later be Dean of the School of Germanic Languages (1948-1970).

Ana Cartianu is known as the "great dame of English studies in Romania.

In 1930, she married Gheorghe Cartianu-Popescu, a university professor. Her maiden name was Tomescu. She died in Bucharest in 2001.

Awards
Romanian Writers' Union Award for translations from Romanian (1973)

 Books (selection) 
 An Advanced Course in Modern Rumanian (co-author, with Leon Levițchi, Virgiliu Ștefănescu-Drăgănești), București, Ed. Științifică, (1958) (1964) 
 Proză eseistică victoriană. Antologie, ("An Anthology of Victorian Essays"), (co-editor, with Ștefan Stoenescu), București, (1969)
 Dicționar al literaturii engleze ("A Dictionary of English Literature"), (co-author, with Ioan Aurel Preda), București (1970)

 Translations 
 Short Stories by Ioan Slavici, 1955
 Romanian Folk Tales, 1979
 Nicolae Ciobanu, Romanian Fantastic Tales, 1981
 Mihai Zamfir, History and Legend in Romanian Short Stories and Tales, 1983
 Vasile Voiculescu, Tales of Fantasy and Magic, 1986
 Selected Works of Ion Creangă and Mihai Eminescu, 1992
 Mircea Eliade, Mystic Stories: The Sacred and the Profane, 1992
 The Tales and Stories of Ispirescu, Murrays Children's Books, London

 Bibliography 
 Ana Cartianu: Festschrift (Editura Universității din București, 2000)
Aurel Sasu, Dicționarul biografic al literaturii române'', Vol. A-L, Ed. Paralela 45, Pitești, 2006, p. 280

References 

1908 births
2001 deaths
Romanian translators
Romanian–English translators
Romanian essayists
Academic staff of the University of Bucharest
20th-century translators
Alumni of Bedford College, London
20th-century essayists
People from Horezu